Lienhardt & Partner Privatbank Zürich (until 2001 Gewerbebank Zürich) is a traditional Swiss universal bank founded in 1868 and based in Zurich. Its core activities include private banking, financing and real estate.

History 
This Zurich based commercial bank was founded in 1868 as the Vorschuss- und Kreditverein der Handwerker des Bezirkes Zürich (Advance and Loan Association of the Craftsmen of the District of Zurich). In 1914 it was transformed to a stock corporation by a cooperative. For decades it remained a regional bank anchored in Zurich with a focus on the tradesmen and small and medium enterprises.

In 1994 the bank joined the newly founded RBA-Holding, the joint organization of Swiss regional banks. Its activities were retail banking with the savings and mortgage business, but also specialized in private banking and real estate management.

In 2001 Franz Lienhardt, owner of the subsidiary Linco AG, specialized in the administration and mediation of real estate, took over the majority of shares of the Gewerbebank Zürich. The remaining shares are spread over around 500 shareholders. The bank was renamed to Lienhardt & Partner Privatbank Zürich AG, which is used in the regional banking network.

References 
Article contains translated text from Lienhardt & Partner Privatbank Zürich on the German Wikipedia retrieved on 12 March 2017.

External links 

Homepage

Banks based in Zürich
Banks established in 1868
Swiss companies established in 1868